Bernie Glow (February 6, 1926 – May 8, 1982) was an American trumpet player who specialized in jazz and commercial lead trumpet from the 1940s to 1970s.

Glow's early career was on the road with Artie Shaw, Woody Herman and others during the last years of the big-band era. The majority of his years were spent as a first-rate New York City studio musician, where he worked with Miles Davis and Frank Sinatra, and did thousands of radio and television recording sessions.

Training 
At The High School of Music & Art, during the Second World War, Bernie played in bands with future notables Stan Getz, Tiny Khan, Shorty Rogers and George Wallington.

Other than the influence of symphonic trumpet masters and his peers, Glow was influenced early on by performances of Snooky Young with the Jimmie Lunceford band, and Billy Butterfield with Benny Goodman.

Early career 1942–1949 

Just sixteen and out of high school, Glow spent a year on the road with the Richard Himber Orchestra. Two years later he was with Xavier Cugat and then Raymond Scott on CBS radio. In 1945 he was playing lead trumpet with the Artie Shaw band. Following that stint, he was with Boyd Raeburn.

In 1949, at 23, he retired from the road after more than a year with Woody Herman and his famous "Second Herd".

NYC freelance years 1949–1952 

In this middle period Glow worked as a trumpet player in a wide variety of situations. He played in big bands, Latin bands and dance orchestras. He performed around Manhattan in theaters, dance halls, night clubs and on the radio. This was the final preparation that launched him into the burgeoning commercial and studio scene.

Studio years 1950s–1970s 

Beginning in 1953 Bernie Glow was a first-call trumpet player and played on thousands of recording sessions. There was great variety in the kinds of music being recorded; One day he would play a radio commercial for Pepsi, and the next he would record an album with Frank Sinatra or Ella Fitzgerald. Many of these studio big-band sessions were led by leading composer/arrangers Nelson Riddle, Quincy Jones and Oliver Nelson. He played on the seminal Miles Davis and Gil Evans collaborations that produced the masterpiece albums Miles Ahead (1957), Porgy and Bess (1958), Sketches of Spain (1959), and Quiet Nights (1962). Glow also spent time as a member of the NBC and CBS staff orchestras.

He played a Bach Stradivarius Bb 72* (lightweight) trumpet.

Death 
He died of a blood disorder in Manhasset at the age of 56.

Discography

As sideman
With Manny Albam 
The Drum Suite (RCA Victor, 1956) with Ernie Wilkins
Jazz Goes to the Movies (Impulse!, 1964)
With Tony Bennett
Tony Bennett at Carnegie Hall (Columbia, 1962)
With George Benson
The Other Side of Abbey Road (CTI, 1969)  
With Bob Brookmeyer
Brookmeyer (Vik, 1956)
Portrait of the Artist (Atlantic, 1960)
Gloomy Sunday and Other Bright Moments (Verve, 1961)
With Ruth Brown 
Late Date with Ruth Brown (Atlantic, 1959)
With Kenny Burrell
Blues - The Common Ground (Verve, 1968) 
Night Song (Verve, 1969)
With Candido Camero
Beautiful (Blue Note, 1970)
With Betty Carter 
Social Call (Columbia, 1956 - released 1980) 
With Al Cohn
 Four Brass One Tenor (RCA Victor, 1955)
Son of Drum Suite (RCA Victor, 1960)
With Hank Crawford
Mr. Blues Plays Lady Soul (Atlantic, 1969)
Wildflower (Kudu, 1973)
With Miles Davis and Gil Evans
Miles Ahead (Columbia, 1957) 
Porgy and Bess (Columbia, 1958) 
Sketches of Spain (Columbia, 1960) 
With Bill Evans 
Symbiosis (MPS, 1974)
With Gil Evans
The Individualism of Gil Evans (Verve, 1964) 
With Art Farmer
The Aztec Suite (United Artists, 1959)
Listen to Art Farmer and the Orchestra (Mercury, 1962)
With Maynard Ferguson
The Blues Roar (Mainstream, 1965)
Primal Scream (Columbia, 1976)
Conquistador (Columbia, 1977)
With Aretha Franklin
Aretha Now (Atlantic, 1968) 
Soul '69 (Atlantic, 1969)
With Curtis Fuller
Cabin in the Sky (Impulse!, 1962) 
With Dizzy Gillespie
Perceptions (Verve, 1961) 
With Jimmy Giuffre
The Music Man (Atlantic, 1958)
With Benny Golson
 Take a Number from 1 to 10 (Argo, 1961)
With Urbie Green
Urbie Green's Big Beautiful Band (Project 3, 1974)
With Eddie Harris
Silver Cycles (Atlantic, 1968)
With Coleman Hawkins
The Hawk in Hi Fi (RCA Victor, 1956)
With Billie Holiday
Lady in Satin (Columbia, 1958)
With Freddie Hubbard
Windjammer (Columbia, 1976)
With Milt Jackson
Big Bags (Riverside, 1962) 
With Al Kooper
You Never Know Who Your Friends Are (Columbia, 1969)
With John Lewis
Odds Against Tomorrow (Soundtrack) (United Artists, 1959)
The Golden Striker (Atlantic, 1960)
With Mundell Lowe
Satan in High Heels (soundtrack) (Charlie Parker, 1961)
With Herbie Mann
Salute to the Flute (Epic, 1957)
With Gary McFarland
The Jazz Version of "How to Succeed in Business without Really Trying" (Verve, 1962)
Profiles (Impulse!, 1966)
With Blue Mitchell 
Smooth as the Wind (Riverside, 1961) 
With the Modern Jazz Quartet
Jazz Dialogue (Atlantic, 1965)
With Wes Montgomery
California Dreaming (Verve, 1966)
With Mark Murphy 
Rah! (Riverside, 1961)  
With Oliver Nelson
Impressions of Phaedra (United Artists Jazz, 1962)
With Joe Newman
Salute to Satch (RCA Victor, 1956)
With Laura Nyro
Eli and the Thirteenth Confession (Columbia, 1968) 
With Anita O'Day
All the Sad Young Men (Verve, 1962)
With Chico O'Farrill
Nine Flags (Impulse!, 1966)
With Tito Puente
Dance Mania (RCA, 1958)
With Nelson Riddle
 Phil Silvers and Swinging Brass (Columbia, 1957)
With Jimmy Smith
The Cat (Verve, 1964)
With Rex Stewart and Cootie Williams
Porgy & Bess Revisited (Warner Bros., 1959)
With Sarah Vaughan 
In the Land of Hi-Fi (EmArcy, 1955)
With Walter Wanderley
Moondreams (A&M/CTI, 1969)
With Dinah Washington
The Swingin' Miss "D" (EmArcy, 1956)
With Doc Severinsen- "The Big Band's Back in Town" -Command records- 1962
With Van McCoy & the Soul City Symphony backing The Stylistics- Trumpet solos on "Do the Hustle" & "I Can't Give You Anything (But My Love)"- 1975

References

External links 
 http://www.allmusic.com/artist/bernie-glow-mn0000759837/biography Allmusic biography
 Bernie Glow recordings at the Discography of American Historical Recordings.
 Verve website
 New Yorker article, 1969
 New York Times obituary, 1982

1926 births
1982 deaths
Musicians from New York City
American jazz trumpeters
American male trumpeters
20th-century American musicians
20th-century trumpeters
The High School of Music & Art alumni
Jazz musicians from New York (state)
20th-century American male musicians
American male jazz musicians
The Tonight Show Band members